Radical 148 or radical horn meaning "horn" is one of the 20 Kangxi radicals (214 radicals in total) composed of 7 strokes.

In the Kangxi Dictionary, there are 158 characters (out of 49,030) to be found under this radical.

 is also the 165th indexing component in the Table of Indexing Chinese Character Components predominantly adopted by Simplified Chinese dictionaries published in mainland China.

Evolution

Derived characters

Variant forms
This radical character has different forms and stroke orders in different languages.

Literature

See also

Unihan Database - U+89D2

148
165